Rio Pangestu Putra (born 30 August 1997) is a Indonesian professional futsal player who plays for the club Indonesia Pro Futsal League, Bintang Timur Surabaya.

Personal life
Rio Pangestu was born in Tangerang, 30 August 1997. He received his education elementary school at SD Negeri Parung Panjang 01. Then he continued his education junior high school at SMP Negeri 10 Depok and education high school at SMA Negeri 5 Depok. After that he continued his education at Jakarta State University.

References

External links 
 Rio Pangestu on Bolalob

Indonesian men's futsal players
1997 births
Living people
People from Tangerang